Juraj Pančík (born 11 May 1990) is a Slovak football midfielder who currently plays for Šamorín.

Club career

FO ŽP Šport Podbrezová
He made his professional debut for ŽP Šport Podbrezová against Slovan Bratislava on 11 July 2014.

References

External links
 
 ŽP Šport Podbrezová profile
 Eurofotbal profile

1990 births
Living people
Slovak footballers
Association football midfielders
FK Železiarne Podbrezová players
FC ŠTK 1914 Šamorín players
Slovak Super Liga players
Sportspeople from Brezno
2. Liga (Slovakia) players